Data Integrator can refer to software used to integrate data, or to a person or company who integrates data:

 Pervasive Data Integrator, software
 SAP BusinessObjects Data Integrator, software
 Oracle Data Integrator, software
 EDI, EZMID Data Integrator, software
 Systems integrator, person or company

See also
 Data integration
 Enterprise application integration
 Comparison of business integration software